Fernand Alphonse Marie Frédéric de Montigny (5 January 1885 – 2 January 1974) was a Belgian fencer and hockey player. He won two silver medals and two bronze in fencing and a bronze in hockey. He was also the architect of the 1920 Olympic Stadium.

Olympic events
 1906 Intercalated Games in Athens
 Fencing – Épée, individual
 Fencing – Épée, team – Bronze medal
 Fencing – Foil, individual
 1908 Summer Olympics in London
 Fencing – Épée, individual
 Fencing – Épée, team – Bronze medal
 1912 Summer Olympics in Stockholm
 Fencing – Épée, individual
 Fencing – Épée, team
 Fencing – Foil, individual
 1920 Summer Olympics in Antwerp
 Fencing – Épée, individual
 Fencing – Foil, individual
 Fencing – Foil, team
 Field hockey – Bronze medal
 1924 Summer Olympics in Paris
 Fencing – Épée, team – Silver medal
 Fencing – Foil, team – Silver medal

References

External links
 

1885 births
1974 deaths
Belgian architects
Belgian male fencers
Belgian épée fencers
Belgian male field hockey players
Olympic fencers of Belgium
Olympic field hockey players of Belgium
Olympic silver medalists for Belgium
Olympic bronze medalists for Belgium
Olympic medalists in fencing
Olympic medalists in field hockey
Medalists at the 1906 Intercalated Games
Medalists at the 1908 Summer Olympics
Medalists at the 1920 Summer Olympics
Medalists at the 1924 Summer Olympics
Fencers at the 1906 Intercalated Games
Fencers at the 1908 Summer Olympics
Fencers at the 1912 Summer Olympics
Fencers at the 1920 Summer Olympics
Fencers at the 1924 Summer Olympics
Field hockey players at the 1920 Summer Olympics
People from Anzegem
Sportspeople from West Flanders
20th-century Belgian people